In Australia there are large concentrations of Italians in many metropolitan areas of Australia. In particular, states such as New South Wales, and Victoria have larger populations of Italian-Australians than other states by national average. According to a recent study, 1 million Australians are of Italian descent. Communities of Italians were established in most major industrial cities of the early 20th century, which established concentrated communities in Sydney. During the labor shortage in the 19th and early 20th centuries, planters in Queensland did attract some Italian immigrants to work as sharecroppers, but they soon left the extreme anti-Italian discrimination and strict regimen of the plantations for towns or other states.

The state of Victoria has had Italian-Australian residents since the 1850s.

Today, Sydney and Melbourne have the largest populations of Italians in Australia.

Victoria
Italians form the third largest ethnicity in Greater Melbourne, after Anglo-Celtic Australians and Chinese Australians. Italians have had a huge influence and contribution to the city's culture. Almost a third of Italian-Australians live in Melbourne - this amounts to over 300,000 people - the largest Italian population in Oceania. Many Italians have origins in Veneto, Piedmont, Sicily and Calabria as well as other regions. There is also a sizeable Swiss-Italian community as well as an Arbëreshë community. Almost a third of Melbourne's Catholics are of Italian descent and there are many Italian-speaking congregations in the city. Italians are largely concentrated in the north and northwestern suburbs however there are many Italians in other areas.

Some suburbs with large Italian communities include (percentage with Italian ancestry):

Little Italy, consisting of Lygon Street and Carlton is Melbourne's designated Italian precinct. 
Fawkner (22%)
Avondale Heights (21%)
Bulleen (21%)
Greenvale (20%)
Keilor East (19%)
Pascoe Vale (19%)
Thomastown (15%)
Mill Park (15%)
Moonee Ponds (13%)
Brunswick East (13%)
Lalor (13%)
Bundoora (10%)
Swiss-Italian community:

 Hepburn Springs

New South Wales
 Leichhardt, a suburb of Sydney
 Ramsay Street, in Haberfield, a suburb of Sydney
 Bossley Park, New South Wales
 New Italy, New South Wales
 Griffith, a city in western New South Wales with a substantial Italian-Australian population

South Australia
 Campbelltown/Athelstone & Norwood in Adelaide
 Salisbury, Virginia and Two Wells
  Thebarton, Torrensville and surrounding areas
 Seaton, Findon and Fulham Gardens

Queensland
 New Farm, a suburb of Brisbane
 Paddington, Queensland, a suburb of Brisbane
 Kedron, Queensland, a suburb of Brisbane
Ingham, Queensland

Western Australia
 Stirling, Western Australia
 Harvey, Western Australia

See also
 Italian Australians

References

Australian people of Italian descent
Italian Australian
Italian-Australian culture